Urland, often styled URLAND, is a performance collective based in Rotterdam, the Netherlands. It was founded in 2010 at the theatre academy of Maastricht. It consists of Ludwig Bindervoet, Thomas Dudkiewicz, Marijn Alexander de Jong and Jimi Zoet.

Biography 
URLAND has created physical and visual performances including De Gabber Opera (2010), De Oktobertragödie (2011), and Kwartet, een Powerballad (2013). They have performed in the Netherlands and abroad, in theatres and clubs like Lowlands. The group, currently all in their twenties, bases its performances on techno music and death metal themes, as well as by epic stories and world literature. 

Since 2013 the group is connected to Theater Rotterdam and receives structural funding from both the Dutch government and the city of Rotterdam. They are currently working on their first production for the ‘big stage’: De Internet Trilogie, a series which questions the rise, expansion and limitless promise of the internet, with a comparison to the Prometheia of Aeschylus. It’s a new epic, or myth, about the creation of the internet.

Productions 
 2019: “De Internet Trilogie”
 2019: “URLAUB”
 2018: “de URtriennale 2018”
 2018: “UR”
 2017: “URLAND presents: Bedtime Stories”
 2016: "INTERNET OF THINGS/Prometheus de vuurbrenger"
 2015: De Internet Trilogie Deel II: EXPLORER/ Prometheus ontketend , a collaboration with CREW Eric Joris
 2015: URLAND PRESENTS 4 NOBLE TRUTHS IN 49 SLIDES
 2014: De Internet Trilogie Deel I: MS DOS/ Prometheus geketend
 2014: URLAND presenteert: 1 zoekresultaten
 2013: Kwartet, een Powerballad (coproductie met Naomi Velissariou)
 2012: House on Mars: PIXELRAVE (coproductie met Het Huis van Bourgondië)
 2012: House on Mars
 2011: De Oktobertragödie (een Komödie)
 2010: De Gabber Opera

References

External links 
 
 THEATER ROTTERDAM

Performance artist collectives
Dutch performance artists
2010 establishments in the Netherlands